Saint-Santin-de-Maurs (literally Saint-Santin of Maurs; Languedocien: Sant Santin de Maurs) is a commune in the Cantal department in south-central France.

Since the French revolution, the town of Saint-Santin has been split in two communes in two different departments, Saint-Santin d'Aveyron in the department of Aveyron and Saint-Santin-de-Maurs.

Population

See also
Communes of the Cantal department

References

Communes of Cantal
Cantal communes articles needing translation from French Wikipedia